Sumatratarda diehlii is a moth in the family Cossidae, and the only species in the genus Sumatratarda. It is found on Sumatra.

References

Ratardinae